Jah Reid (born July 21, 1988) is a former American football offensive tackle. He was drafted by the Baltimore Ravens in the third round of the 2011 NFL Draft. He played college football at UCF, University of Central Florida.

Early years
Reid attended Haines City High School, where he played high school football for the Hornets.

Professional career

Baltimore Ravens
Reid was drafted by the Baltimore Ravens in the third round of the 2011 NFL Draft. On September 5, 2015, he was released by the Ravens.

Kansas City Chiefs
On September 7, 2015, Reid was signed by the Kansas City Chiefs.

On August 31, 2017, Reid was released by the Chiefs.

Houston Texans
On September 18, 2017, Reid was signed by the Houston Texans. He was released on October 10, 2017.

Off-field headlines
Reid was arrested March 9, 2014 and charged with two misdemeanor counts of battery while at a South Florida stripclub. According to the arrest affidavit, security footage viewed by the arresting officer shows Reid being accidentally bumped into by Edmond Mussa, which triggered an argument. Reid then allegedly charged Mussa, head-butted and punched him causing Mussa to fall to the ground, Reid allegedly began kicking him once he was on the ground. When security guard David Smith intervened, police said Reid punched Smith in the face.

References

External links
 UCF Knights bio
 

1988 births
Living people
People from Kissimmee, Florida
Players of American football from Florida
Sportspeople from Greater Orlando
American football offensive tackles
UCF Knights football players
Baltimore Ravens players
Kansas City Chiefs players
Houston Texans players